Cobairdy Castle was a 16th-century tower house, about  north-east of Huntly, Aberdeenshire, Scotland, west of Burn of Connairdy.
It may have been built as early as 1500.

History
The property belonged to the Murrays; it was transferred to the Burnetts.

It has been replaced by a 19th-century mansion of two storeys, Cobairdy House.

Structure
There is no trace of the castle nor evidence of its structure.

See also
Castles in Great Britain and Ireland
List of castles in Scotland

References

Castles in Aberdeenshire